Hamilton High School is a public high school in Chandler, Arizona, United States. It is Arizona's largest high school and the 64th in the nation, with more than 4,100 students.

History 
Hamilton's campus resides on land originally owned by the Hamilton family. Family patriarch, John Augustus Hamilton, helped found the city of Chandler serving as the sheriff for all of what is now considered southeast Phoenix Metropolitan Area. According to the Chandler Museum and the Chandler Historical Society, Jerry Loper Field marks the location of the Hamilton family's general store. During that time period, locals referred the current Arizona Avenue/SR 87 and Ocotillo Boulevard as "Hamilton's Corner".

As Phoenix and subsequently Chandler area became more populated, Chandler High School was unable to handle the community's increasing educational needs. Voters in 1996 granted Chandler Unified School District (CUSD) a $33 million USD bond to purchase 359,341 ft2 (3,338.3 m2) property and awarded Stantec the construction contract for the original Hamilton High School campus.  The school becoming operational in 1998 with Fred DePrez as principal and 1,600 freshmen through junior level students greatly relieving the pressure on Chandler High School.

Academics

Hamilton's curriculum is aligned with the standards set by the Arizona Department of Education and implements the state's Education and Career Action Plan (ECAP) required for all students grades 9–12 to graduate from a public Arizona with a high school diploma. CUSD high schools also implements an open enrollment policy, meaning students from outside the intended school boundaries may attend without tuition or other penalties.

Arizona requires that all high school students take 6 credit bearing courses during their freshmen through junior years, and provides the option for students on track for graduation the ability to reduce their course lad to 4 credit bearing courses. However, CUSD requires all students must complete 22 credits whereas the public university system controlled by the Arizona Board of Regents requires only 16 credits in the following areas:

 English - 4 credits
 Mathematics - 4 credits
 Science - 3 credits
 Social Studies. - 3 credits
 Career and Technical Educator/Fine Arts - 1 credit
 Physical Education - 1 credit
 Comprehensive Health -  credits
 Elective Courses - 5  credits

Cross-credit courses 
At Hamilton and all CUSD high school students may swap three semesters ( credits per semester) of Spiritline, Beginning through Advance Dance, Drill Team, Color Guard, Marching Band, Winter guard, or AFJROTC essentially waiving the required one Physical Education credit required for graduation.

Students which choose applied sciences in areas such as Applied Biology or Applied Agricultural Sciences gain equivalent Science credits. Likewise, Economics credits can be awarded like Agricultural Business Management, Business, Business Applications, Marketing, Economics Applications, Family and Consumer Sciences, and vocational courses.

Community college credits can be awarded through a partnership with Chandler-Gilbert Community College (CGCC) and cooperative credits for vocational courses are provided by East Valley Institute of Technology (EVIT). Students must be dually enrolled for the Arizona community college or the Arizona public university system to accept the credits towards a degree. CUSD Transportation Department provides routes between Hamilton, EVIT, and CGCC with after school hours transportation intended for students participating in activities.

Separate from EVIT and CGCC, the University of Arizona implemented a pilot program to get university credits for students pursuing introductory engineering courses starting in 2014.

Accolades 
The Arizona Education Foundation awarded its A+ School of Excellence award to Hamilton in 2005, 2009, and 2013. In 2014 it was the 15th highest scoring school on Arizona's Instrument to Measure Standards (AIMS) tests and the top non-magnet school participating in the annual public school examination. The Presidential Excellence Award in Mathematics and Science was presented to Deborah Nipar in 2019 for her work as an AP Chemistry and Honors Science Research instructor, one of five recipients from Arizona.

Students have achieved many honors including: National Merit Honors, Western Governors Association's annual Spirit Award, honorable mentions for the Governor's Celebration of Innovation Award, and ASU Gammage High School Musical Theatre Awards.

Statistics 
US News reports in 2019 a 95% graduation rate, 51% reading proficiency, 51% mathematics proficiency, 35% passed an AP examination, and 44% attempting an AP examination with an overall rating is 90.78/100. According to the report Hamilton ranked 15th in the Phoenix Metropolitan Area, 23rd in the state of Arizona, and 1,590th nationally. Starting in 2019's Arizona Measurement for Educational Readiness to Inform Teachers (AzMERIT), which replaced the Arizona's Instrument to Measure Standards (AIMS) testing, indicating students were 88.6% prepared.

The same report says 22% are free lunch program participants, 3% are reduce-price lunch program, and 25% meet the qualifications of being economically disadvantaged.

Other events 
Hamilton hosted the Breaking Barriers for Excellence Equity Symposium 2019 for improving student teacher relationships.

The non-denominational Phoenix Church of Christ holds events on Wednesday nights and Sunday in the auditorium.

Extracurricular activities

Athletics
Hamilton is an Arizona Interscholastic Association (AIA) member school offering boys and girls sports complying with Title IX. Student athletes can participate in varsity, junior varsity, and freshmen only teams as well as individual sports under the AIA's 6A Conference. Hamilton Athletics consist of these sports:

 Badminton (Girls)
 Baseball
 Basketball (Boys and Girls)
 Cheer (Girls and Coed)
 Cross Country (Boys and Girls)†
 Flag football
 Football
 Golf (Boys and Girls)†
 Hockey Competitive
 Lacrosse (Boys and Girls)
 Pomline
 Soccer (Boys and Girls)
 Softball
 Swim and Dive (Boys and Girls)†
 Tennis (Boys and Girls)†
 Track and field (Boys and Girls)†
 Volleyball (Boys and Girls)
 Wrestling (Boys and Girls)

† denotes individual and team sports

Baseball 

Since Hamilton started play the team has amassed 7 Arizona State Championships in its first 20 years placing the school third behind St. David (12) and Scottsdale Chaparral (10) since 1985. In 2020, the team climbed from a preseason ranking of #4 to #1 in the nation by MaxPreps' Xcellent 25 poll with an 8–0 record prior to the closing of all public schools indefinitely because of the COVID-19 Pandemic. The program has produced many collegiate and professional players, most notably the MLB's 2019 National League Most Valuable Player Cody Bellinger.

Basketball 

The varsity girls basketball team has won Arizona's 6A State Championships in the 2015–16 and 2018–19 seasons.

Flag Football 
Starting in the 2022–23 season, the AIA officially introduced girls flag football for member schools to complete. Hamilton Athletics was amongst the first schools to adopt the newly approved sport.

Football 
The large number of players participating in the football program during their freshmen year has resulted in Hamilton fielding two freshmen-only teams playing exclusively inside Arizona's 6A conference against other freshmen only teams.

History 
John Wrenn was the first employee hired from Homewood-Flossmoor High School in Flossmoor, Illinois and began building a strong staff for the program. Hamilton began competing in 1998 in the 5A conference as a freelance team and despite their 7–2 record, there were not able to compete in the state championship playoffs.The AIA placed Hamilton into the Fiesta Region the following year where the team earned most of their region titles. The program gain more attention when Terrell Suggs, a future Arizona State University and NFL player, transferred from Chandler High School setting school and state records at the running back and defensive end positions. Local media acknowledged his success by anointing him as the best football player produced exclusively from Arizona.

Hamilton's dominance for the next 15 years would start in 2001 with their first appearance in the 5A State Championship game losing to Red Mountain 13–10. The first State Championship would come in 2003 going on to win 7 Big School State Championship, appear in an additional 8, and clinching 11 region titles. During this time period, Hamilton football has been ranked nationally several times peeking at #4 nationally by USA Today's Super25 poll when the state record 53-game win streak was broken in November 2011 by Desert Vista High School.

National and International Play 
The team has also traveled nationally and internationally playing some of the best teams. Starting in September 2006, Hamilton traveled to Massillon, OH to play Washington High School for the McDonald's Kirk Herbstreit Football Challenge losing 35–26. The 2008 team traveled to Miami, FL playing Booker T. Washington High School, a 37–19 win. Hamilton would host Las Vegas's #11 Bishop Gorman High School at Northern Arizona University's Walkup Skydome in 2014 for a 24–17 win ranked #16 before the game. Hamilton's first hosting an out of state team playing was Santa Fe High School from Santa Fe Springs, CA during the 2009 season shutting out their opponents 52–0.

The 2012 season featured an invitation from the Global Ireland Football Tournament setup by University of Notre Dame and the US Navy Academy. The tournament placed Hamilton against perennial powerhouse Notre Dame High School traveled from Sherman Oaks, CA defeating Hamilton 27–15 at Parnell Park, in Dublin. The following season had Eastlake High School from Chula Vista, CA was hosted in San Diego with the Huskies winning 28–17. Hamilton returned to out of state play in 2018 traveling to Las Vegas's Arbor View High School winning 23–17. Arbor View High School would visited Hamilton the next year losing 41–7.

During the first 20 years of the varsity football playing against non-Arizona team, Hamilton has amassed a 5–5 record overall.

Hazing case 
In 2017 an investigation into alleged hazing by members of the Hamilton football team became public. The investigation alleges several incidences starting in September 2015 that included sexual assault, assault, aggravated assault, molestation, kidnapping, and child abuse. Ultimately three students were charged, two as minors and one as an adult. CUSD reassigned the varsity football coach Steve Belles, the athletic director, and the principal to the district offices indefinitely in September 2017. Investigators recommended child abuse and failure to report child abuse charges as the case became convoluted with video and audio evidence of witness tampering and victim intimidation. Maricopa County Attorney General Bill Montgomery later announce his office would not be seeking charges against the three administrators. Families of five alleged victims filed civil lawsuits against Chandler Unified School District and Hamilton administrators settling in 2019 for an undisclosed amount. The 2018 hiring of Mike Zbedski varsity head coach relieving interim head coach Dick Baniszewski and Belles resigned from CUSD for Juan Diego Catholic High School in Draper, Utah as a position coach. After 3 years of criminal proceedings, the sole student charged as an adult accepted a plea deal in February 2020 for a single misdemeanor charge of aggravated assault where the sentence was credited as time served.

Golf

Boys Team 
The boys team has won the 2011 and 2019 National Championship at the Antigua National High School Golf Invitational. They have also won 5 consecutive championships for a total of 7 championships in AIA's Boys Team Golf State Championships.

 Arizona State Championship: 2005, 2006, 2007, 2008, 2009, 2014, and 2019 
Runners-up: 2018 
Third Place: 2011 (tie), 2013, 2015, and 2017

Girls Team 
The girls team won the AIA's Girls Team Golf State Championship in 2010 

Arizona State Champions: 2010 
Runners-up: 2011, 2012, 2016, 2017, 2018, and 2019 
Third Place: 2018, 2019, and 2020

Soccer

Boys Team 

The Boys Team have won the AIA's State Championship during 2012 and 2016.

Girls Team 

Hamilton's only AIA State Championship occurred during the 2011 season.

Softball 

The varsity softball team has won back-to-back state titles in 2016 and 2017.

Volleyball 
In Arizona, the AIA schedules the Boys Team to play during the fall semester while the Girls Team play during the spring.

Boys Team

Girls Team

Academic Competitions 
The Arizona Interscholastic Associations (AIA) allow member schools to participate in sports or other competitive events that are not regulated by the AIA. These other competitions can have their own governing body and any infractions do not carry over into AIA regulated sports. Hamilton has never been sanctioned by any non-AIA governing body.

Academic Decathlon 
The Academic Decathlon has accumulated numerous team and individual awards including Region IV Arizona State Championship and region titles during the 2018–19 and 2019–20 seasons. The team would an Arizona State Championship Runners Up trophy during the 2017–18 season. During the 2018–19 season, they would compete against 73 schools from the United States, China, and the United Kingdom placing 4th overall and 3rd in the Academic Decathlon's Super Quiz competition.

Robotics 
Hamilton High School Robotics Team, known as the "Microbots" and registered as "Team 698", has built award-winning robots for the FIRST Robotics Competition. In its inaugural year of 2001, the team won a Regional Award at the Southern California Competitions. The Arizona Regionals selected the team for Judges' Award in 2003 with the Industrial Safety Award and the Entrepreneurship Award in 2014. The 2017 Arizona West Regional would award a FIRST Dean's List Finalist Award. Several technology companies within the city of Chandler sponsor and mentor the students during all phases of the competitions.

Rivalry 
A high-profile rivalry developed between Chandler High School and Hamilton High School which are separated by  along Arizona Avenue/SR 87. Local media has since daubed this high-profile competition as the "Battle of Arizona Avenue". The annual varsity football matchup gains the most attention where the highly rated players are often recruited by college football coaches from across the nation. Spectator turnout can exceeded 10,000 with NFL players like Anquan Boldin, Larry Fitzgerald, Matt Leinart, Hamilton alumni Terrell Suggs also in attendance. As a consistent Top 25 rivalry, the High School Bowl Series Series has been instrumental in broadcast the game nationally by ESPN, ESPNU, and the NFHS Network. Every year the game would alternate form Chandler's Austin Field to Hamilton's Jerry Looper Stadium. Hamilton began matchup with a 17-game win streak of until the 2013 regular season matchup gave Chandler their first win 26–16. Chandler would later fall in a 2013 5A Division I State Semifinal matchup to Hamilton 21–17 at the AIA's approved neutral field at Highland High School. Since 2014 Chandler has won 6 consecutive games. As of 2020, Hamilton leads the series 18–8 with a potential rematch during the 2020 Open Bracket, which contains 8 of the highest ranked teams. Together, the two school account for 12 Big School State Championships in football. Together, the two school account for 12 Big School State Championships in football and 9 runners up honors.

The annual game during the regular season alternates form Chandler's Austin Field to Hamilton's Jerry Looper Stadium. Hamilton began matchup with a 17-game win streak until the 2013 regular season matchup gave Chandler their first win 26–16. Chandler would later fall in a 2013 5A Division I State Semifinal matchup to Hamilton 21–17 at Highland High School the neutral field approved by the Arizona Interscholastic Association. Since 2014 Chandler has won 6 consecutive games. As of 2020, Hamilton leads the series 18–9 with a number of rematches during the big school playoffs. As the rivalry developed beyond football, both school's athletic teams and other activities have become very competitive. Chandler city officials and other organizations have help facilitate and advance the rivalry. The most notable addition was the Chandler Rotary Club providing the trophy where brass plate are inscribed with the victors name and date with a custom street sign labeled "Arizona Ave Champions" affixed on top. A luncheon is also hosted by the Rotary Club with school staff, administrators, and inductees to the Chandler Sports Hall of Fame.

Since the rivalry garners so much attention, security is a constant concern within the stadiums and surrounding areas. CUSD enlists all School Resource Officers as well as privately contracted security throughout the entire school district along with extra resources from city, state, and federal law enforcement agencies. Additional officers, including SWAT teams and K-9 units, are integrated throughout the city. Digital surveillance like social media monitoring to temporary surveillance cameras are also used.

Campus 

Hamilton was constructed by Stantec on a $33 million USD bond issued to CUSD on a 359,341 ft2 (3,338.3 m2) property on the northwest corner of Arizona Avenue/SR 87 and Ocotillo Boulevard. The main building is two stories tall with an administrative wing (A-wing) on the bottom floor next to the main entrance. Students have the option of eating indoors or in a shaded patio. Food services are located along the south end of the indoor eating area with supporting facilities directly behind them (B-wing) offering students 6 styles of food.

The traditional classrooms are found in three 2-story wings (C-wing, D-wing, and E-wing) in a square formation with classrooms on both sides of the hallways and one independent staircase located in a rear corner per wing. The main corridor has two staircases and an elevator for disabled or injured students.

Within D-wing's ground floor has a child care service called Lil' Express Learning Center  open to faculty and students implementing the Arizona Department of Educations Early Childhood Education program. The Learning Center also has a walled off and covered playground on the north end of the campus. Also on the ground floor is the special education classrooms for developmentally challenged students with licensed speech, occupational, and physical therapists adhering to Title I.

All of the performing arts like concert band, orchestra, gymnastics, dance, and art are located on the southeast portion of the main building (H-wing) surrounding the 600-seat auditorium. Locker rooms and a small wight lifting room surround the gym (G-Wing). In the northern parking lot and near the N Wing are mobile classrooms (M-Wing) with 2 classrooms per building due to the large student population.

CUSD was granted a $192 million USD bond in November 2015 for district wide construction and updates. Hamilton was allocated $4.5 million for a two-story building (N-wing) with a 20 classroom and additional administration offices 27,530 ft2 (2,557.6 m2) located on what was the original outdoor concrete basketball courts.

Sports facilities 
The largest sports facility on the Hamilton property is Jerry Loper Field which host all football, soccer, track and field, and other events. The field's namesake is for the late Chandler High School football coach Jerry Loper who was killed by an impaired driver in 1996. Stands are available on the east and west side of the field with an initial capacity of 6,000 fans, however CUSD has installed temporary stands for high-profile events like the "Battle of Arizona Ave". Within Jerry Loper Field are two field houses, the first was built during the construction of the school and the second is a $2.3 million USD 9,585 ft2 (890.5 m2) weightlifting facility for student athletics completed 2019. Concession stands, restrooms, and ticket facilities are also within the gates.

Dale Hancock Gymnasium inside the school is capable of seating 3,000 fans with collapsible stands on either side of the main basketball court which is sunk a few feet lower. The namesake is for the late CUSD Board of Education member Dale Hancock in 2011. The gymnasium houses several events including basketball, volleyball, badminton, pep-rallies, the Hamilton Invitational Science and Engineering Fair (HISEF), and other events.

The original campus layout included Hamilton Bus Yard, run by CUSD's Transportation Department. In 2005, it was closed and replaced with new asphalt providing a practice area for the Hamilton Marching Band during the fall season and serves as an auxiliary parking for large events. The remaining original sports facilities are 4 baseball diamonds, 3 softball diamonds, 2 practice football fields, 10 tennis courts, and batting cages with auxiliary facilities like bathrooms and ticket sales buildings. The ticket sales buildings were closed around the COVID-19 pandemic. Currently, all CUSD schools events began using a QR code to digitally purchase tickets through a contracted online vendor.

Public facilities 
Along the southeast corner of the campus is a branch of the Chandler Public Library operated and funded by the City of Chandler. There are doors that allow people direct access to the library from inside the school, however they do not allow people from the library access to the school.

The Hamilton Aquatic Center is an open air multipurpose community pool opened to the public during the spring and summer months. It does serve as the home of Hamilton's Swim and Dive team featuring a regulation lap pool and moveable stands for fans.

Notable people

Faculty
Steve Belles - NFL/AFL Quarterback - Former Varsity Head Football Coach
Sean Bubin - NFL/CFL/NFLE Offensive Linemen - Junior Varsity Offensive Line Football Coach
Darryl Clack - NFL/CFL Running Back - Junior Varsity Running Backs Football Coach
Rick Cunningham - NFL/CFL Offensive Tackle - Freshmen Offensive Line Football Coach
Johnny Johnson - NFL Running Back - Junior Varsity Defensive Backs Football Coach
Kenny King - NFL Defensive Linemen - Former Freshmen Head Coach and Defensive Line/Wight Lifting Football Coach
Deborah Nipar - Educator - 2019 Presidential Excellence Award in Mathematics and Science Recipient
Anthony Parker - NFL Cornerback - Varsity Cornerbacks Football Coach
Lindsay Taylor - WNBA/TKBL/LFB/WKBL Center - Varsity Assistant Girls Basketball Coach
Mark Tucker - NFL Lineman/AFL Arizona Rattler coach - Varsity Defensive Line Football Coach
Bob Wylie - NFL Defensive Coordinator - Former Varsity Defensive Coordinator Football Coach

Alumni

Athletes 
 Zach Bauman - NFL/CFL - player with the Arizona Cardinals and Edmonton Eskimos
Cody Bellinger - MLB - player with the Los Angeles Dodgers
 Eric Farris - MLB - former player with the Milwaukee Brewers
Tony Cascio - MLS - player with the Arizona United
Tyler Johnstone - NFL/CFL - player with the Los Angeles Chargers and Montreal Alouettes
Chan Kim - PGA - player in the Canadian Golf Tour and Japan Golf Tour
Glenn Love - CFL - player with the BC Lions, Calgary Stampeders, Saskatchewan Roughriders, and Montreal Alouettes
Cole Luke - NFL - player with the Carolina Panthers and Washington Football Team
Richard T. Lee - PGA/KPGA - player in the Nationwide Tour and Asian Tour
Dontay Moch - NFL/CFL - player with the Cincinnati Bengals, Arizona Cardinals, Tennessee Titans, and Toronto Argonauts
 Mitch Nay - MiLB - player drafted by the Toronto Blue Jays and plays for the Chattanooga Lookouts
Hannah O'Sullivan - 2015 U.S. Women's Amateur Golf champion
Camden Pulkinen - Figure Skater - played for Team USA in the Olympics as well as individually at the US National Champion and World Record Holder
 Gerell Robinson - NFL - former player with the Cleveland Browns
Terrell Suggs - NFL - player with the Baltimore Ravens, Arizona Cardinals, and Kansas City Chiefs
 Kerry Taylor - NFL - former player with the Arizona Cardinals and Jacksonville Jaguars
 Christian Westerman - NFL - player the Cincinnati Bengals
 Andrew Yun - PGA - 2011 and 2012 Palmer Cup

Other 

 Kylee Saunders - Entertainer - J-Pop star
 Parris Sheets - Author - Essence of Ohr trilogy
 Viputheshwar Sitaraman - Entrepreneur - CEO and Founder of Explica, Inc.

References

External links

Hamilton High School's Official Website
Chandler Unified School District's Official Website
Hamilton School Report Card from the Arizona Department of Education
EVIT - Hamilton High School from the Arizona Department of Education
Lil' Express Learning Center 

Educational institutions established in 1998
Public high schools in Arizona
Public libraries in Arizona
Education in Chandler, Arizona
Schools in Maricopa County, Arizona
1998 establishments in Arizona
Buildings and structures in Chandler, Arizona